Sergio Mangín (born June 28, 1973) is an Argentine sprint canoer who has competed in the mid-1990s. At the 1996 Summer Olympics in Atlanta, he was eliminated in the semifinals of the K-2 500 m event.

References
Sports-Reference.com profile

1973 births
Argentine male canoeists
Canoeists at the 1996 Summer Olympics
Living people
Olympic canoeists of Argentina
Place of birth missing (living people)
Pan American Games medalists in canoeing
Pan American Games bronze medalists for Argentina
Canoeists at the 1995 Pan American Games
Medalists at the 1995 Pan American Games